The Russian men's national under 20 ice hockey team is the national under-20 ice hockey team in Russia. The team represented Russia at the International Ice Hockey Federation's World Junior Hockey Championship, held annually every December and January. After the 2022 Russian invasion of Ukraine, the International Ice Hockey Federation suspended Russia from all levels of competition.

History

Russia competed as an independent nation for the first time at the 1993 World Junior Ice Hockey Championships in Gävle, Sweden. Russia won their first medal, a bronze at the 1994 World Junior Ice Hockey Championships in Ostrava, Czech Republic. Russia would earn silver in 1995, bronze in 1996 and 1997, and silver in 1998 after a devastating 2–1 overtime loss to Finland. Russia won their first gold medal in 1999, after defeating Canada 3–2 in overtime. 

Russia hosted the World Junior U20 Hockey Championships in Moscow. In the quarterfinal game against Sweden Russia lost 4–3. The loss resulted in head coach Pavel Vorobiev showing his frustration towards his team. Switzerland and Russia engaged in a linebrawl in a placement game the same year, in which resulted in suspensions. Russia went on to win their second gold medal against Canada in 2002. Russia lost the quarter-final game in 2004.

During the 2004–05 NHL lockout, the tournament in North Dakota had the best players, who were due to make their NHL debuts made available. Canada and Russia met up in the gold medal game, which resulted in a 6–1 win for Canada. A year later, Russia would lose gold to Canada (5–0), and again in 2007 (4–2).

Russia's Alexei Cherepanov was due to represent Russia at the 2009 World Junior Ice Hockey Championships in Canada. Cherepanov died on 13 October 2008 at the age of 19 during a Kontinental Hockey League game when he collapsed on the bench after a line change. Russia was ousted by Canada in the semi-finals and go on to would win bronze over Slovakia.

After the 2022 Russian invasion of Ukraine, the International Ice Hockey Federation suspended Russia from all levels of competition.

World Junior Ice Hockey Championships record

 1974–1992 – as  
 1993 – 6th place
 1994 –  Bronze
 1995 –  Silver
 1996 –  Bronze
 1997 –  Bronze
 1998 –  Silver
 1999 –  Gold
 2000 –  Silver
 2001 – 7th place
 2002 –  Gold
 2003 –  Gold
 2004 – 5th place
 2005 –  Silver
 2006 –  Silver
 2007 –  Silver
 2008 –  Bronze
 2009 –  Bronze
 2010 – 6th place
 2011 –  Gold
 2012 –  Silver
 2013 –  Bronze
 2014 –  Bronze
 2015 –  Silver
 2016 –  Silver
 2017 –  Bronze
 2018 – 5th place
 2019 –  Bronze
 2020 –  Silver
 2021 – 4th place

References

External links
 Team Russia U20 all-time statistical leaders at QuantHockey.com
Russian men's national under 20 ice hockey team 

junior
Junior national ice hockey teams